Ye-seo is a Korean female given name.

People with this name include:
Dang Ye-seo (born 1981), naturalized South Korean table tennis player
Jeon Ye-seo (born 1981), South Korean actress
Kang Ye-seo (born 2005), South Korean singer and actress

Fictional characters with this name include:
Shin Ye-seo, in 2004 South Korean television series First Love of a Royal Prince
Han Ye-seo, in 2006 South Korean television series Great Inheritance
Kang Ye-seo, in 2018 South Korean television series Sky Castle

See also
List of Korean given names

References

Korean feminine given names